Herne Hill  is a district in South London, approximately four miles from Charing Cross and bordered by Brixton, Camberwell, Dulwich, and Tulse Hill. It sits to the north and east of Brockwell Park and straddles the boundary between the boroughs of Lambeth and Southwark. There is a road of the same name in the area (which is part of the A215 and was formerly called Herne Hill Road), as well as a railway station.

Toponymy

In Rocque's 1746 map, the area is shown as "Island Green", probably reflecting the presence of the River Effra and smaller tributaries. Early references to the area also use the form "Ireland Green".

The earliest documented reference to "Herne Hill" is in two fire insurance policies issued by the Sun Insurance Company in 1792 (where the spelling is "Hearns" and "Herns" Hill).

History

1291 - Manor of Milkwell

The area now known as Herne Hill was part of the Manor of Milkwell, which existed from at least 1291, and was a mixture of farms and woodland until the late 18th century. It was divided between the ancient parishes of Camberwell and Lambeth.

1783 - Samuel Sanders
In 1783, Samuel Sanders (a timber merchant) bought the land now occupied by Denmark Hill and Herne Hill from the Manor; he then began granting leases for large plots of land to wealthy families.

Mid-19th century
By the mid-19th century, the road from the modern Herne Hill Junction to Denmark Hill was lined with large residential estates and the area had become a prosperous suburb for the merchant class. (John Ruskin grew up, from the age of 4, in a house on Herne Hill).

1862 - arrival of the London, Chatman & Dover Railway
Herne Hill was transformed by the arrival of the London, Chatham & Dover Railway in 1862. Cheap and convenient access to London Victoria, the City of London, Kent and south-west London created demand for middle-class housing; the terraced streets that now characterise the area were constructed in the decades after the opening of Herne Hill station and the old estates were entirely built over.

The Half Moon public house
The Half Moon is a Grade II* listed public house in Half Moon Lane.

During World War II five V-1 flying bombs caused six deaths.

August 2013 floods
During the early morning of 7 August 2013, an 88‑year‑old 0.9 m diameter water main on Half Moon Lane burst, flooding Herne Hill, Dulwich Road and Norwood Road along with 36 properties (including the Half Moon public house) to create a scene described as "biblical" by local residents. Thames Water admitted liability and estimated the total cost of the damage to be around £4 million. The Half Moon reopened in March 2017, following a vigorous local campaign to save it as a pub; Southwark Council has designated it an asset of community value.

Local landmarks

Brockwell Park
The area is home to the  Brockwell Park. Near a hilltop in Brockwell Park stands the Grade II* listed Brockwell Hall, which was built in 1831. The hall and the land surrounding it were opened to the public in 1891 after being purchased by London County Council. Brockwell Park hosts the annual Lambeth Country Show and was the site of London's Gay Pride festival for several years in the 1990s. The park also houses Brockwell Lido, a 1937 open-air swimming-pool that faces on to Dulwich Road.

The railway station
Herne Hill railway station on Railton Road was opened by the London, Chatham and Dover Railway in 1862; the Gothic, polychrome brick station building was Grade II listed in 1998. The associated railway viaduct and bridges are also noteworthy; The Building News stated in 1863 that the viaduct was "one of the most ornamental pieces of work we have ever seen attempted on a railway" for its fine brickwork.

Herne Hill Velodrome
The Herne Hill Velodrome, situated in a park off Burbage Road, was built in 1891 and hosted the track cycling events in the 1948 Summer Olympics. Unlike most modern, steeply-banked velodromes, it is a shallow concrete bowl; the 'Save the Herne Hill Velodrome' campaign is seeking a way to secure the future of the site. The same park also has a football pitch and was the home of Crystal Palace F.C. from 1915 until 1918.

Sam Mussabini - 84 Burbage Road
A Blue Plaque at 84 Burbage Road marks the former home of the athletics coach Sam Mussabini. Mussabini was later immortalised in the film Chariots of Fire, in which he was played by actor Ian Holm. In 1894, Mussabini was appointed coach to the Dunlop cycling team which trained at the Herne Hill Velodrome. In 1913, Mussabini was appointed coach to the Polytechnic Harriers at the Herne Hill athletics track, which ran round the inside of the Velodrome cycle track. Here he trained athletes, including the fourteen-year-old Harold Abrahams.

Conservation area
In recognition of the historical importance and specialist character of the area within its urban context, Stradella Road was designated as a Conservation Area, by Southwark Council in 2000, under the Civic Amenities Act of 1967. The Conservation Area consists principally of properties in Stradella and Winterbrook Roads, and includes bordering properties in Burbage Road and Half Moon Lane.

The Half Moon Public House 
The Half Moon Public House on Half Moon Lane was built in 1896 (although a tavern has existed on the site since the 17th century) and was Grade II* listed in 1998.  The pub hosted a boxing gym for more than 50 years. The Commercial on Railton Road was rebuilt in 1938, and is locally listed by Lambeth Council as an inter-war pub of architectural and historic interest.

St Paul's Church
The Church of St Paul on Herne Hill was originally built by G Alexander in 1843 at a cost of £4,958, but dramatically rebuilt by Gothic architect G E Street in 1858 after a destructive fire. It is now Grade II* listed.

Sunray Gardens pond
The lake in Sunray Gardens (at the junction of Elmwood Road and Red Post Hill) was originally the fish pond in Casino House (a large estate established in 1796/97, now demolished); the adjoining Casino Estate still bears the house's name.

Delawyk Crescent
Delawyk Crescent is a housing estate with an unusual Radburn layout, separating vehicle and pedestrian movements. It was built in the 1960s and 1970s built on land from the Dulwich Estate.

Hurst Street Estate
Hurst Street Estate comprises two pentagon plan tower blocks, Park View House and Herne Hill House, both 19 storeys (52 meters) high which dominate the skyline of the area. Completed in 1968 by Lambeth Borough Council, they each contain 72 dwellings.

Carnegie Public Library
The Carnegie Public Library on the road now named Herne Hill Road (not to be confused with the earlier Herne Hill Road, now known as Herne Hill) opened in 1906 after a Lambeth librarian got a grant from Andrew Carnegie for building a library within the Herne Hill area. It is also a listed Grade II building.

Sax Rohmer - 51 Herne Hill
A Blue Plaque at 51 Herne Hill (by the junction with Danecroft Road) marks the former home of author Sax Rohmer (a.k.a. Arthur Henry Ward), most famous as author of the series of novels featuring the master criminal Dr. Fu Manchu.

Politics 
Herne Hill is represented on the Southwark London Borough Council by councillors for Dulwich Village ward and on the Lambeth London Borough Council by councillors for both the Herne Hill & Loughborough Junction and West Dulwich wards.  Both wards are held by the Labour Party although Dulwich Village was historically a Conservative ward until the 2018 Southwark London Borough Council elections. Herne Hill is represented in the London Assembly by Marina Ahmad and in Westminster by Helen Hayes.

Transport

Buses 
The London bus routes are 3, 37, 42, 68, 196, 201, 322, 468, P4 school route 690 and night buses N3 and N68.

Rail 
Direct rail services are available from Herne Hill railway station to Blackfriars, City Thameslink, Farringdon, St Pancras International, and St Albans (all via the Thameslink Wimbledon loop) and Victoria (via Southeastern Metro Bromley South line).

Nearby railway stations offer services to other destinations: London Bridge can be reached from North Dulwich and Tulse Hill; Denmark Hill has trains to Clapham Junction and Highbury and Islington via the London Overground's South London Line. The nearest London Underground station is Brixton on the Victoria line. There have been past proposals to extend the Victoria line to Herne Hill station on a large reversing loop.

Notable residents

References

External links

The Herne Hill Forum
The Herne Hill Society
Hidden London
Old images of Herne Hill

 
Districts of the London Borough of Lambeth
Districts of the London Borough of Southwark
Streets in the London Borough of Lambeth
History of the London Borough of Lambeth
Streets in the London Borough of Southwark
History of the London Borough of Southwark
Areas of London
District centres of London